Texas v. Johnson, 491 U.S. 397 (1989), is a landmark decision by the Supreme Court of the United States in which the Court held, 5–4, that burning the American flag was protected speech under the First Amendment to the U.S. Constitution, as doing so counts as symbolic speech and political speech.

In the case, activist Gregory Lee Johnson was convicted for burning an American flag during a protest outside the 1984 Republican National Convention in Dallas, Texas, and was fined $2,000 and sentenced to one year in jail in accordance with Texas law. Justice William Brennan wrote for the five-justice majority that Johnson's flag burning was protected under the freedom of speech, and therefore the state could not censor Johnson nor punish him for his actions.

The ruling invalidated prohibitions on desecrating the American flag, which at the time were enforced in 48 of the 50 states. The ruling was unpopular with the general public and lawmakers, with President George H. W. Bush calling flag burning "dead wrong". The ruling was challenged by Congress, who passed the Flag Protection Act later that year, making flag desecration a federal crime. The law's legitimacy was questioned before the Supreme Court, which again affirmed in United States v. Eichman (1990) that flag burning was a protected form of free speech, and overruled the Flag Protection Act as unconstitutional. In the years following the ruling, Congress considered the Flag Desecration Amendment several times, which would amend the Constitution to make flag burning illegal, but has never successfully passed. The issue of flag burning remained controversial decades later, and it is still utilized as a form of protest.

Background

On August 22, 1984, Gregory Lee Johnson, then a member of the Revolutionary Communist Youth Brigade, participated in a political demonstration during the 1984 Republican National Convention in Dallas, protesting the policies of the Reagan administration. The protestors marched through the streets, chanting political slogans and staging "die-ins" at several corporate buildings to dramatize the effects of nuclear war. Several protestors occasionally stopped to spray-paint walls and knock over potted plants, although Johnson himself took no part in it. At the Mercantile Bank Building, protestors removed the American flag from the flagpole outside. An unknown protestor handed the flag to Johnson, who hid it under his shirt.

When the protestors reached Dallas City Hall, Johnson poured kerosene on the flag and set it on fire. During the burning of the flag, protestors shouted phrases such as, "America, the red, white, and blue, we spit on you, you stand for plunder, you will go under." No one was injured during the demonstration, though some witnesses to the flag burning felt deeply offended. Johnson was arrested within a half hour of igniting the flag. One spectator, a Korean War veteran named Daniel Walker, tearfully gathered the remains of the flags and buried them in the backyard of his home in Fort Worth.

Johnson was charged with violating the Texas flag desecration statute, which prohibited the vandalism of respected or venerated objects. Johnson was the only individual at the protest to be criminally charged. He was initially indicted on one count of disorderly conduct, but the charge was eventually dropped. On December 13, 1984, a six-person jury found Johnson guilty of flag desecration, and he was subsequently sentenced to one year in jail and fined $2,000. Johnson appealed his conviction to the Fifth Court of Appeals of Texas, but was again found criminally liable. He then appealed to the Texas Court of Criminal Appeals, which overturned his conviction, finding that Johnson's First Amendment rights had been violated. The court found that Johnson's actions were symbolic speech protected by the First Amendment, writing that, "a government cannot mandate by fiat a feeling of unity in its citizens. Therefore that very same government cannot carve out a symbol of unity and prescribe a set of approved messages to be associated with that symbol." The Texas Court of Criminal Appeals also affirmed that his actions did not constitute a breach of the peace. 

Texas filed a writ of certiorari to the Supreme Court, asking them to review the case. In 1988, the Supreme Court granted certiorari.

Opinion of the Court 

Oral arguments were held on March 21, 1989. David D. Cole and William Kunstler argued the case on behalf of Gregory Lee Johnson, and Kathi Alyce Drew argued on behalf of the state of Texas. During oral arguments, the state defended its statute on two grounds: first, states had a compelling interest in preserving a venerated national symbol; and second, the state had a compelling interest in preventing breaches of peace. The Supreme Court handed down a 5–4 opinion on June 21, 1989, in favor of Johnson. Justice William Brennan authored a majority opinion which Justices Thurgood Marshall, Harry Blackmun, Antonin Scalia, and Anthony Kennedy joined. Kennedy also authored a separate concurring opinion.

In the majority opinion, Brennan reiterated the Court's long-held recognition that the First Amendment to the United States Constitution protects non-speech acts as being symbolic speech, writing that the First Amendment's protection on speech "does not end at the spoken or written word". The Court recognized flags as being vessels for symbolic speech in Stromberg v. California (1931), in which the Court overturned the conviction of a youth camp worker who displayed a red flag at the camp. Brennan also invoked Tinker v. Des Moines Independent Community School District (1969), in which the Court recognized the wearing of a black armband as a form of speech, to demonstrate the Court's history of recognizing symbolic actions as protected speech. The Court would then analyze whether Johnson's actions could be considered symbolic speech, which would allow him to challenge his conviction by invoking the First Amendment.

In Spence v. Washington (1974), the Court rejected "the view that an apparently limitless variety of conduct can be labeled 'speech' whenever the person engaging in the conduct intends thereby to express an idea", but acknowledged that conduct may be "sufficiently imbued with elements of communication to fall within the scope of the First and Fourteenth Amendments." To determine whether a particular act possesses the elements of "speech" required to invoke the First Amendment, the Court asked whether "an intent to convey a particularized message was present, and [whether] the likelihood was great that the message would be understood by those who viewed it." The Court found, based on Spence, that Johnson's burning of the flag "constituted expressive conduct, permitting him to invoke the First Amendment." Brennan wrote that the political nature of the flag burning was "both intentional and overwhelmingly apparent", having coincided with the Republican National Convention.

The Court rejected that Johnson was liable for a breach of the peace, writing that, "no disturbance of the peace actually occurred or threatened to occur because Johnson burned the flag." While the state of Texas argued that flag burning is punishable on the basis that it "tends to incite" breaches of the peace, the Court disagreed, finding that flag burning does not necessarily lead to breaches of the peace. Citing Brandenburg v. Ohio (1969), Brennan wrote that the state may only punish speech that would incite "imminent lawless action", and rejected that flag burning constituted such.

Kennedy's concurrence 
Justice Kennedy filed a concurring opinion with Brennan's majority. In it, Kennedy acknowledged the potentially unpopular nature of the holding, but affirmed that the role of the Supreme Court is to uphold the integrity of the Constitution, even if "sometimes we must make decisions we do not like." Kennedy continued:

Rehnquist's dissent 
Chief Justice William H. Rehnquist filed a dissenting opinion with the Court, joined by Justices Byron White and Sandra Day O'Connor. Rehnquist argued that the "unique position" of the flag "justifies a governmental prohibition against flag burning in the way respondent Johnson did here." Rehnquist discussed the significance of the flag as applied throughout American history, such as during the colonial era, the War of 1812, and the Civil War, writing that burning a symbol of national unification was distinctly separate from other political demonstrations where freedom of speech might protect protestors. Rehnquist wrote:

Rehnquist argued that the flag held a unique position in American tradition, such as on the gravesites of Armed Forces members, and as such should be held in a unique position in First Amendment case law. Rehnquist invoked several previous rulings by the Court that showed a recognition of the flag as a unique national symbol, including Halter v. Nebraska (1907), in which the Court upheld the constitutionality of a Nebraska statute that made it illegal to use the American flag on commercial merchandise. Rehnquist quoted Justice John Marshall Harlan's majority opinion in writing: "For that flag every true American has not simply an appreciation, but a deep affection." However, the Johnson majority found a lack of evidence in the Constitution that implied that the flag should be held in a position of "uniqueness". Brennan answered this claim directly in writing: "There is, moreover, no indication—either in the text of the Constitution or in our cases interpreting it—that a separate juridical category exists for the American flag alone", concluding that "we decline, therefore, to create for the flag an exception to the joust of principles protected by the First Amendment."

Rehnquist further argued that Johnson's burning of the flag did not constitute expressive conduct, writing that flag burning is "no essential part of any exposition of ideas", but rather "the equivalent of an inarticulate grunt or roar that, it seems fair to say, is most likely to be indulged in not to express any particular idea, but to antagonize others." He opined that the Texas statute was a reasonable restriction only on how Johnson's idea was expressed, leaving Johnson with "a full panoply of other symbols and every conceivable form of verbal expression to express his deep disapproval of national policy."

Stevens's dissent 
Justice John Paul Stevens also filed a dissenting opinion. Stevens argued for the cultural importance of the flag and all that it stands for, more broadly than just as a symbol of national unity. He wrote of the flag:

Stevens compared public desecration of the flag to posting bulletin boards on the Washington Monument, writing that such behavior "might enlarge the market for free expression, but at a cost I would not pay". He asserted that Johnson was not punished for his opinion, but rather for the way he chose to express it.

Subsequent developments

Public reaction 
The ruling was highly unpopular and controversial among Americans, and drew overwhelming criticism from the public. Legal scholar Geoffrey R. Stone remarked that the ruling was "wildly unpopular" with the American people, and Newsweek described a sense of "stunned outrage" across the country. In a nationwide public opinion poll taken shortly after the ruling, 75% of respondents disagreed with the decision, and nearly two-thirds supported the idea of a constitutional amendment to protect the flag. Polls taken by the National Opinion Research Center showed a decline in respondents expressing "a great deal of confidence" in the Court, dropping from 34% before the ruling, to 17% after; however, confidence levels might have been influenced by the Court's ruling in Webster v. Reproductive Health Services two weeks after Johnson.

At a rally to raise support for the Flag Desecration Amendment, Senator Bob Dole said: "Americans may not know every nuance of Constitutional law. But they knew desecration when they see it. They're demanding action." In a statement to the Senate on July 18, 1989, Senator Strom Thurmond said that the ruling "opened an emotional hydrant across our country demanding immediate action". On October 4, 1989, Senator Trent Lott told the Senate that, while visiting constituents in Mississippi, he "heard outrage" in "city after city", and claimed that several people he witnessed were "in tears over the decision".

While initial support for the Flag Desecration Amendment was high among Americans, with a Newsweek poll indicating 71% of Americans agreed with such an idea, public support for the amendment waned by the following month. By late July, Senate Majority Leader George J. Mitchell reported his constituents were "equally divided" between those who supported a new amendment, and those who supported the Johnson ruling. Public opinion polls by Gallup show a downward trend in respondents supporting the amendment, from 71% in favor in 1989, to 68% in 1990, to 55% in 2005. A 2006 CNN poll showed similar figures, with 56% of respondents in favor, and 40% opposed. A 2006 Pew Research poll reported only 49% of respondents listing a flag burning amendment as "very important".

The issue of flag burning remained controversial decades later. Protestors around the country continue to burn the flag as a form of anti-government protest, including during the Ferguson unrest in 2014, during the George Floyd protests in 2020, and during the abortion protests in 2022.

Legislative history 
The Court's ruling invalidated laws against desecrating the American flag, which at the time were enforced in every state except Alaska and Wyoming.

On June 22, 1989, one day after the ruling, the 101st Congress of the Senate passed a resolution to express "profound disappointment" in the Court's decision, by a vote of 97-3. On June 27, the House of Representatives passed a resolution expressing "profound concern" with the decision, by a vote of 411-5. President George H. W. Bush was also strongly opposed to the ruling, calling flag burning "dead wrong". Bush asked Congress to supersede Johnson by passing a new constitutional amendment to outlaw flag burning. On June 30, Bush spoke before a crowd at the Iwo Jima Memorial in Washington, D.C. to express his distaste for the Court's decision, urging Congress to act quickly. On September 12, the House of Representatives passed a resolution that came to be known as the Flag Protection Act of 1989, which made it a federal crime to desecrate the flag in any way, including burning it. The bill passed the Senate on October 5, and was enacted into law without Bush's signature.

The law was immediately challenged by Gregory Lee Johnson, who, along with three other protestors, burned the flag on the steps of the Capitol Building the day the law went into effect, on October 30, 1989. All four were charged in violation of the Flag Protection Act, but the charges against Johnson were dropped because he failed to ignite his flag. Johnson decried their refusal to prosecute him as a "miscarriage of justice", stating that he was "outraged". The case against the remaining three protestors was dismissed by federal judges, citing Johnson as grounds, but attorneys appealed the case to the Supreme Court, who granted certiorari on March 31, 1990. In United States v. Eichman (1990), the Court once again upheld that flag burning was protected speech under the First Amendment, with the same five justices in Johnson forming the majority. In an opinion also written by Justice Brennan, the Court declared the Flag Protection Act of 1989 unconstitutional, and overruled it.

Since then, Congress has considered the Flag Desecration Amendment several times, first by the 104th Congress in 1995, and most recently by the 109th Congress in 2006. The resolution passed the House of Representatives three times: in 1995, in 1999, and in 2005. However, the bill has always been defeated in the Senate. The most recent measure passed the House of Representatives on June 22, 2005, but failed by one vote in the Senate on June 27, 2006. In 2020, interest in the Flag Desecration Amendment was revived when President Donald Trump said during a rally in Tulsa, Oklahoma that he believed burning the flag should be punished by one year in jail, and asked the Supreme Court to "reconsider" their rulings in Johnson and Eichman.

On July 20, 2016, Gregory Lee Johnson was again arrested for burning the American flag during the Republican National Convention, which was being held in Cleveland, Ohio. Prosecutors eventually dropped the charges in January 2017, and the city of Cleveland agreed to pay Johnson $225,000 in settlements.

See also
Gregory Lee Johnson
Flag desecration
Street v. New York
Flag Protection Act
United States v. Eichman
Flag Desecration Amendment
Stromberg v. California
 List of United States Supreme Court cases
 Lists of United States Supreme Court cases by volume
 List of United States Supreme Court cases, volume 491

Footnotes

References

Further reading

External links

Thoughts on Flag Burning and other statements by Edward Hasbrouck and Joey Johnson

United States Supreme Court cases
United States Supreme Court cases of the Rehnquist Court
United States Free Speech Clause case law
1989 in United States case law
Flag controversies in the United States
American Civil Liberties Union litigation
Legal history of Texas